Swastik Samal (born 27 July 2000) is an Indian cricketer. He made his Twenty20 debut for Odisha in the 2018–19 Syed Mushtaq Ali Trophy on 24 February 2019. He made his List A debut on 4 October 2019, for Odisha in the 2019–20 Vijay Hazare Trophy.

References

External links
 

2000 births
Living people
Indian cricketers
Odisha cricketers
People from Koraput
Cricketers from Odisha